Gragnague is a commune in the Haute-Garonne department in southwestern France.

Population

The inhabitants of the commune are known as Gragnaguais.

Transport
Gragnague station has rail connections to Toulouse, Albi and Rodez.

Monument

See also
Communes of the Haute-Garonne department

References

Communes of Haute-Garonne